The Order of Pahlavi of the Empire of Iran, in Persian: "Neshan-e Pahlavi" was the highest order of the former Imperial State of Iran.

History
The Order was instituted in 1932 by Rezā Shāh, the founder of the Dynasty of the Pahlavi, and it was awarded in two classes, i.e.: 1st class (with collar) and 2nd class (without collar). It was Iran's highest-ranking order and was named for the family name of the Shah. The 1st class was limited to the immediate Iranian Imperial Family, reigning monarchs, and foreign heads of state. The 2nd class was awarded to other male members of the Iranian Imperial Family and to crown princes of foreign nations.

The order was abolished by the Islamic Republic of Iran after the fall of the last Shah. Since then, the order exists as the highest dynastical decoration of the Imperial House of Pahlavi.

The decorations include a golden collar with blue and gold links, the jewel of the order hanging from a broad ribbon and a star on the breast.

The badge is a precious jewel made in the shape of a cross with imperial crowns as arms. In the space between the arms golden and blue rays are placed. In the central medallion, Mount Damavand is depicted with a rising sun behind it. The star is the same as the jewel.

The Second Class of the Order bears a jewel with links between the crowns. The ribbon was blue with a gold rim.

Recipients
 Abdul Halim of Kedah
 Abdullah I of Jordan
 Prince Aimone, Duke of Aosta
 Baudouin of Belgium
 Bhumibol Adulyadej
 Faisal I of Iraq
 Faisal II of Iraq
 Farouk of Egypt
 Frederick IX of Denmark
 George VI
 Ghazi of Iraq
 Giovanni Leone
 Gustaf VI Adolf of Sweden
 Habib Bourguiba
 Haile Selassie
 Hassan II of Morocco
 Hussein of Jordan
 Isa bin Salman Al Khalifa
 Ismail Nasiruddin of Terengganu
 Yahya Khan
 Edvard Beneš
 Heinrich Lübke
 Mahendra of Nepal
 Iskander Mirza
 Mohammad Reza Pahlavi
 Olav V of Norway
 Ali Reza Pahlavi (son of Reza Shah)
 Gholamreza Pahlavi
 Reza Pahlavi, Crown Prince of Iran
 Qaboos bin Said al Said
 Mohammed Zahir Shah
 Josip Broz Tito
 Suharto
 Charles de Gaulle
 King Saud of Saudi Arabia 
 Urho Kekkonen

References

External links

 Order of Pahlavi - Department of State, May 1975
 Orders & Decorations of Pahlavi dynasty are exhibited in the ORDER section of the website
 Images on medals.org.uk

Civil awards and decorations of Iran
Dynastic orders